Big Momma's House: Music from the Motion Picture is the soundtrack to Raja Gosnell's 2000 comedy film Big Momma's House. It was released on May 30, 2000 via So So Def Recordings and consisted of hip hop and R&B music. Production was primarily handled by Jermaine Dupri. The soundtrack was a minor success, making it to 41 on the Billboard 200 and 12 on the Top R&B/Hip-Hop Albums, and featured three singles, "Bounce with Me", "I've Got to Have It" and "Get Up".

The song "Bounce with Me" served as the film's theme song, and the soundtrack's lead single. In addition to this, this is the only film in the series to have a soundtrack.

Track listing

Notes
  signifies a co-producer

Charts

References

External links
 

2000 soundtrack albums
Hip hop soundtracks
2000s film soundtrack albums
Comedy film soundtracks
Albums produced by Lil Jon
Albums produced by Warren G
So So Def Recordings albums
Albums produced by Trackmasters
Albums produced by Jermaine Dupri
Albums produced by Bryan-Michael Cox